Diana Loghin (born 23 April 1997) is a Moldovan footballer who plays as a defender and has appeared for the Moldova women's national team.

Career
Loghin has been capped for the Moldova national team, appearing for the team during the 2019 FIFA Women's World Cup qualifying cycle.

References

External links
 
 
 

1997 births
Living people
Moldovan women's footballers
Moldova women's international footballers
Women's association football defenders
Agarista-ȘS Anenii Noi players